is a city in Yamanashi Prefecture, Japan. , the city had an estimated population of 69,463 in 29,406 households, and a population density of 340 persons per km2.

Geography
Fuefuki is located in central Yamanashi Prefecture at an average altitude of 261 meters.  Just over 58% of the area of the city is covered in forest. The Fuefuki River flows through the city.

Neighboring municipalities
The following municipalities surrounding the city clockwise starting from Kōfu.
Kōfu
Yamanashi 
Kōshū
Ōtsuki
Fuji-kawaguchiko, Minamitsuru District

Climate
The city has a climate characterized by hot and humid summers, and relatively mild winters (Köppen climate classification Cfa).  The average annual temperature in Fuefuki is 10.7 °C. The average annual rainfall is 1524 mm with September as the wettest month. The temperatures are highest on average in August, at around 22.8 °C, and lowest in January, at around -1.0 °C.

Demographics
Per Japanese census data, the population of Fuefuki peaked around the year 2000 and has declined since.

History
Fuefuki was the center of ancient Kai Province and contains many burial mounds from the Kofun period. The ruins of the Kai Kokubun-ji, the Nara period provincial temple are also found within the city limits, as is the Ichinomiya Asama Shrine, the ichinomiya of Kai Province. During the Edo period, all of Kai Province was tenryō territory under direct control of the Tokugawa shogunate, with a daikansho based at the village of Isawa. During the cadastral reform of the early Meiji period on April 1, 1889, the rural districts of Higashiyatsushiro and Higashiyamanashi Districts were formed.
 
The modern city of Fuefuki was established on October 12, 2004, from the merger of the towns of Ichinomiya, Isawa, Misaka and Yatsushiro, the village of Sakaigawa (all from Higashiyatsushiro District), and the town of Kasugai (from Higashiyamanashi District). The name refers to the Fuefuki River that flows through the city. The city hall is located at the former Isawa Town Hall, and other former towns and village halls were converted to satellite offices.

On August 1, 2006, Fuefuki later absorbed the village of Ashigawa (also from Higashiyatsushiro District. Higashiyatsushiro District was dissolved as a result of this merger.

Government
Fuefuki has a mayor-council form of government with a directly elected mayor and a unicameral city legislature of 19 members.

Economy
The economy of Fuefuki is based on agriculture (horticulture), seasonal tourism and the production of wine. Fuefuki is the largest producer of grapes and peaches in Japan.

Education
Fuefuki has 14 public elementary schools and five public junior high schools operated by the city government, and one public high school operated by the Yamanashi Prefectural Board of Education.

Elementary Schools:

Isawa Minami (South) 石和南
Isawa Higashi (East) 石和東
Isawa Kita (North) 石和北
Fujimi 富士見
Isawa Nishi (West) 石和西
Misaka Higashi (East) 御坂東
Misaka Nishi (West) 御坂西
Ichinomiya Nishi (West) 一宮西
Ichinomiya Minami (South) 一宮南
Ichinomiya Kita (North) 一宮北
Yatsushiro 八代
Sakaigawa 境川
Kasugai 春日居
Ashigawa 芦川

Junior High Schools:

Isawa 石和
Misaka 御坂
Ichinomiya 一宮
Asakawa 浅川
Kasugai 春日居

High School:
Fuefuki 笛吹

Gallery

Transportation

Railway
 East Japan Railway Company -   Chūō Main Line 
  -

Highways
  Chūō Expressway

Sister cities
 - Tateyama, Chiba – since May 1973 with former Isawa Town 
 - Fujikawaguchiko, Yamanashi – since July 1962 with former Misaka Town
 - Ichinomiya, Chiba – since April 1982 with former Ichinomiya Town 
 - Yui, Shizuoka since April 1989 with former Yatsushiro Town
 - Tainai, Niigata since October 1996 with former Sakaigawa Village
 - Sado, Niigata since October 1989 with former Kasugai Town 
 - Bad Mergentheim, Baden-Württemberg, Germany  – since 1991 with former Isawa Town
 - Nuits-Saint-Georges, Côte-d'Or, France  – since 1992 with former Ichinomiya Town
 – Feicheng, Shandong, China  – since 1994 with former Ichinomiya Town

Local attractions
Yamanashi Prefectural Museum
The Shakado Museum of Jomon Culture

Notable people from Fuefuki
Dakotsu Iida, haiku poet

In popular culture 
 Fuefuki served as the inspiration for the fictional town of Inaba in the 2008 video game Persona 4.

References

External links

Official Website 

Cities in Yamanashi Prefecture
Fuefuki, Yamanashi